Raghav Sachar (born 24 July 1981, in India) is an Indian singer, composer and film scorer.

Early life and career 

Sachar was born to father, R. K. Sachar, and mother, Usha Sachar in Calcutta
. He is the youngest of three children. He started playing his first instrument, the harmonica, at the age of four. Every year since then his parents have given him an instrument. Born into a family of music lovers, Raghav was interested in music from a very early age.

 He won the Best Drummer Award at the Pepsi Cornucopia contest in Delhi in 1994 besides being adjudged the best keyboard player at the BITS Pilani Festival. At the age of 15, he was chosen by the government of India as their representative in Russia for a cultural exchange program. He also formed a band, Canzona, with some friends where they toured all over India and played at key places like the IITs, BITS Pilani etc. before proceeding to Monash Conservatory of Music, Melbourne in 2000 to study music. Raghav is an alumnus of Mount St. Mary's, Delhi Cantt.

He studied Music & Composition and Performance with the main instrument, the Saxophone and minor instrument being flute, and did his majors in Jazz at Monash. It was during this time that Raghav toured as a "One-Man Band" to countries in South East Asia including Taiwan, South Korea, Hong Kong, Singapore and Malaysia.

Raghav has also done affiliated courses from the Berklee College of Music, Boston and Trinity College of London.

He gave solo concerts while visiting India and worked with Viva and Shubha Mudgal on albums apart from recording for jingles for advertisements such as Coca-Cola, Pepsi, Sony Walkman etc. and film soundtracks. His crowning glory was being awarded the Golden Key Award and Earnest Award for academic excellence in 2000 and 2001 at Monash. He was termed as a Born Genius and featured in National Geographic’s Worldwide Television Series titled “My Brilliant Brain”. He has performed live for over 2000 public, corporate and private shows since 2003. Raghav now plays more than 33 instruments.

Albums 
He released his first album "Raghav- For The First Time" in 2003 through HMV records, followed by three other albums released through Universal Music in 2005 and 2007. Raghav's albums such as "24 Carat", "Play It Loud" and "Charming Lootera" enjoyed commercial success throughout India. "Vande Mataram" released in 2010 was launched by Hon'ble Ministers Kamalnath and Jaipal Reddy. 12 of his albums have been released under his own label "Raghav Sachar Music" (founded in 2009) between 2009 and 2015.

Raghav Sachar Productions 
Founded in 2011, "Raghav Sachar Productions" tends to films, and live events and music videos.

Films 
Raghav debuted as a music director for the film “Kabul Express”, by “Yash Raj Productions” in 2005. Since then he has composed songs for films such as "One Two three", and "Bittoo Boss" amongst many others. He also played numerous instruments in various Bollywood blockbuster films, such as, Salaam Namaste, Parineeta, Dhoom, Kaal, Hum Tum, Yehaan, Black Friday, Kal Ho Na Ho, Don to name a few. He has played in over 150 films till date.

Collaborations 
Raghav has collaborated with leading music directors such as: A.R. Rahman, Vishal–Shekhar, Shankar–Ehsaan–Loy, Salim–Sulaiman, Anu Malik and Pritam.He has also recorded and performed with leading artists such as: Dave Weckl (International Jazz Drummer), Sonu Nigam, Shreya Ghoshal, Sunidhi Chauhan, Kailash Kher, Shankar Mahadevan, Adnan Sami, Shubha Mudgal, Neeraj Shridhar, Kunal Ganjawala, Sivamani, Niladri Kumar, Taufiq Qureshi, Louis Banks, Ranjit Barot, etc.

Performing and other projects 
 Performed for Satyapaul at Madam Tussauds (London) in 2004.
 Performed on behalf of Government of India as a Cultural Ambassador in Germany, Japan and UK in 2006–2007.
 Performed in a 26-city concert tour titled “Idea Rocks India” as their headline act in 2007.
 Performed at the Waldorf Astoria, New York for award ceremonies of overseas Indian community in 2007 and 2009.
 Performed live at the closing ceremony of Commonwealth Games held in Delhi, India in 2010.
 Performed live at the World Economic Forum held in Davos, Switzerland in 2011.
 Live performances at several fashion shows like Lakme India Fashion Week, Wills India Fashion Week, India International Jewelry Week (IIJW) to name a few. 
 Several performances for various IPL teams like Mumbai Indians, Rajasthan Royals etc.
 Performed for a New Year's Eve event of Mr. Mukesh Ambani in Serengeti National Park (Africa) in 2010–11.
 Performed in UAE, Thailand, Malaysia, Singapore, Hong Kong, Kenya, Australia, USA among others for various Corporate, Fashion, private and public events between 2000 and 2015.

 Performed for various Product Launches of leading brands such as, Audi, Mercedes Benz, BMW, Toyota, Honda, Lakme, Wills Lifestyle, Provogue, Samsung, Blackberry, Nokia, Sony, Vodafone, Airtel, Google and Reliance to name some.
 Judged and appeared in numerous reality TV shows viz., Indian Idol, The Voice, Saregamapa, Little Champs, Fame Gurukul, Movers & Shakers and has had several TV interviews on all leading channels.

Endorsements 
 Endorsed by the Leading guitar Gibson since 2010.
 Endorsed by Yamaha for Wind Instruments since 2012.
 By Samsung for Smartphones in 2012.

Brand ambassador 
 Sony MP3 Walkman in 2006.
 For Kwality Walls Cornetto in 2010

Personal life

On 21 January 2014 Raghav married actress Amita Pathak in Mumbai.

Albums

Film soundtracks

Filmography

References

External links

"Ragav new movie One Two Three"
"Home page"
Raghav Sachar interview with QNA India

1981 births
Living people
Indian male pop singers
Indian male singer-songwriters
Indian singer-songwriters
Indian male playback singers
Bollywood playback singers
Singers from Delhi
Musicians from West Bengal